Manki is a village near by Tordher. It is 20km from Swabi and 13km from Jehangira.
 
Manki is an administrative unit, known as Union council of Swabi District in the Khyber Pakhtunkhwa province of Pakistan.

District Swabi has 4 tehsils: Swabi Tehsil, Lahor, Topi Tehsil and Razar. Each comprises a certain number of union councils. There are 56 union councils in Swabi.

See also 

Swabi District

External links
Khyber-Pakhtunkhwa Government website section on Lower Dir
United Nations
 HAJJ website Uploads
PBS paiman.jsi.com

Populated places in Swabi District
Union councils of Khyber Pakhtunkhwa
Union Councils of Swabi District